John Michael Cornforth (born 7 October 1967) is a former Wales international football player and is now a coach. Originally from Whitley Bay in the north-east of England, Cornforth and his family have been settled in Devon for some time.

Cornforth is currently assistant manager at Northern Premier side Blyth Spartans.

Playing career
Cornforth usually appeared in midfield during his playing days. He made a total of 322 starts for his various clubs over his career, scoring 36 goals in the process. Whilst at Swansea City he was a part of the team that won after a penalty shootout in the 1994 Football League Trophy Final. At one point he commanded a transfer fee of £350,000, in his 1996 transfer from Swansea to Birmingham City. His four-and-a-half years and nearly 200 games for Swansea led him to declare himself "a true Jack".

International career
Cornforth was eligible to play for the Wales national football team due to his paternal grandmother, who was from Llantrisant. He had two caps before a cruciate ligament injury interrupted his career.

Coaching career
Cornforth was player-coach, assistant manager and manager of Exeter City.

In July 2004 he joined the coaching team (unpaid) at his local side Crediton United.

In September 2004 he took over from Peter Nicholas as manager of Newport County but was sacked in 2005.

In January 2006 Cornforth took over as caretaker manager at Torquay United from Leroy Rosenior with the side deep in relegation trouble; soon afterwards, he was appointed as manager until the end of the season. The side's form worsened however, and Ian Atkins replaced Cornforth in April, having joined the club as an advisor to Cornforth the previous month. Against all odds, Atkins managed to rescue the side and lift them a comfortable three points clear from relegation.

In August 2007, Cornforth rejoined his local side Crediton United as an advisor. The following month he was reported to be combining this role with working as a milk tanker driver, while hoping for a return to football management at a higher level.

In November 2010 Cornforth was appointed Manager of South West Peninsula League side Witheridge.

In February 2012 Cornforth joined Blyth Spartans F.C. as Assistant manager to Tom Wade.

Honours
Individual
PFA Team of the Year: 1994–95 Second Division

References

External links
Soccerbase player profile
Profile at UpThePosh! The Peterborough United Database

1967 births
Living people
Welsh footballers
Wales international footballers
Sunderland A.F.C. players
Doncaster Rovers F.C. players
Shrewsbury Town F.C. players
Lincoln City F.C. players
Swansea City A.F.C. players
Birmingham City F.C. players
Wycombe Wanderers F.C. players
Peterborough United F.C. players
Cardiff City F.C. players
Scunthorpe United F.C. players
Exeter City F.C. players
Welsh football managers
Newport County A.F.C. managers
Exeter City F.C. managers
Torquay United F.C. managers
English Football League players
People from Whitley Bay
Footballers from Tyne and Wear
Association football midfielders